Tokumoto (written: 徳元) is a Japanese surname. Notable people with the surname include:

Shuhei Tokumoto (born 1995), Japanese footballer
 (born 1976), Japanese volleyball player

Japanese-language surnames